The Sun Fast 40 is a French sailboat that was designed by Daniel Andrieu as a racer-cruiser and first built in 2003.

Production
The design was built by Jeanneau in France, starting in 2003, but it is now out of production.

Design
The Sun Fast 40 is a recreational keelboat, built predominantly of fiberglass, with wood trim. It has a fractional sloop rig, with three sets of swept spreaders and aluminum spars with stainless steel wire rigging. The hull has a raked stem, a reverse transom with a swimming platform, an internally mounted spade-type rudder controlled by twin wheels and a fixed fin keel or optional deep-draft "performance" keel. The fin keel model displaces  and carries  of cast iron ballast, while the performance version displaces  and carries  of lead and iron ballast.

The design has sleeping accommodation for four or six people, with a double "V"-berth in the bow cabin, a "U"-shaped settee and two seats in the main cabin and an aft cabin with a double berth on the port side, or, optionally, two aft cabins, each with double berths. The galley is located on the starboard side at the companionway ladder. The galley is "L"-shaped and is equipped with a two-burner stove, an ice box and a double sink. The head is located aft on the port side. An optional second head may be fitted in the bow cabin, on the starboard side.

Operational history
The boat was at one time supported by a class club that organized racing events, the Sun Fast Association.

A 2004 review Boats.com reported, "Jeanneau makes its entry into the crowded 40' racer/cruiser fleet with the new Sun Fast 40. Jeanneau asked designer Daniel Andrieu to create a true multi-purpose boat, with speed potential to keep up with other 40' racer/cruisers, yet retain a comfortable interior for cruising and weekending. The Sun Fast line by Jeanneau accentuates the racer in racer/cruiser; their Sun Odyssey line is targeted specifically at the cruising market."

See also
List of sailing boat types

References

External links

Photo of a Sun Fast 40 side view
Photo of a Sun Fast 40 showing transom

Keelboats
2000s sailboat type designs
Sailing yachts
Sailboat type designs by Daniel Andrieu
Sailboat types built by Jeanneau